The 2009 Superleague Formula season was the second Superleague Formula championship. The series was rebranded the "Superleague Formula by Sonangol" for this season and also 2010 with the Angolan oil company becoming the title sponsor. It began on June 28 at Magny-Cours and finished on November 8 at Jarama.

The field remained at 18 clubs for the 2009 season but Beijing Guoan did not return to try to retain the title which they won with Davide Rigon in 2008, however Rigon did return in the car of Olympiacos CFP despite GP2 commitments. In Estoril, María de Villota became the first woman to race in the series and Sébastien Bourdais became the most successful racing driver to enter the series having been dropped by Scuderia Toro Rosso just weeks earlier. Bourdais described Superleague as "the best alternative to F1".

Liverpool F.C., run under Hitech Junior Team with driver Adrián Vallés, were crowned series champions for the first time at the last event of the season.

Teams and drivers
 All teams competed on Michelin tyres.

 Giorgio Pantano had signed an official deal with Al Ain before the team announced they would not be able to compete in this season. A week later however, they changed their decision and entered the championship with drivers Miguel Molina and Esteban Guerrieri before having Sevilla FC take their place from round 3 at Donington Park.
 Beijing Guoan and Borussia Dortmund did not compete this year.
 FC Midtjylland, Olympique Lyonnais and Sporting CP made their debut in 2009.
 CR Flamengo and A.S. Roma swapped race teams prior to round 4 of the series, with Flamengo switching from ADR to Azerti and Roma going the other way.
 Reid Motorsport took over the cars of Galatasaray S.K. and Sevilla FC from Ultimate Motorsport prior to round 5 at the Autodromo Nazionale Monza.

Test/reserve drivers

Driver changes
Changed teams
 Yelmer Buurman: PSV Eindhoven → R.S.C. Anderlecht
 Craig Dolby: R.S.C. Anderlecht → Tottenham Hotspur
 Davide Rigon: Beijing Guoan → Olympiacos CFP
 Duncan Tappy: Tottenham Hotspur → Galatasaray S.K.

Entering/Re-Entering Superleague Formula
 Enrique Bernoldi: IndyCar Series (Conquest Racing) →  CR Flamengo
 Jonathan Kennard: Sabbatical →  A.S. Roma
 John Martin: British Formula Three Championship (Räikkönen Robertson Racing) →  Rangers F.C.
 Miguel Molina: World Series by Renault (Prema Powerteam) →  Al Ain
 Nelson Panciatici: Spanish Formula Three Championship (Hache International) →  Olympique Lyonnais
 Giorgio Pantano: GP2 Series (Racing Engineering) → A.C. Milan
 Pedro Petiz: Porsche Supercup (Racing Team Jetstream) → Sporting CP
 Ho-Pin Tung: GP2 Series (Trident Racing) →  Atlético Madrid

Leaving Superleague Formula
 Bertrand Baguette: Al Ain → World Series by Renault (Draco Racing)
 Ryan Dalziel: Rangers F.C. → Rolex Sports Car Series (Alegra Motorsports)
 Robert Doornbos: A.C. Milan → IndyCar Series (Newman/Haas/Lanigan Racing)
 Borja García: Sevilla FC → Atlantic Championship (Condor Motorsports)
 Stamatis Katsimis: Olympiacos CFP → Greek Rally Championship (Mitsubishi Lancer)
 Alessandro Pier Guidi: Galatasaray S.K. → FIA GT Championship (Vitaphone Racing)
 Tuka Rocha: CR Flamengo → Sabbatical
 Andy Soucek: Atlético Madrid → FIA Formula Two Championship
 Enrico Toccacelo: Borussia Dortmund → Sabbatical
 James Walker: Borussia Dortmund → World Series by Renault  (P1 Motorsport)

Mid-season changes
 Carlo van Dam replaced Dominick Muermans at PSV Eindhoven at the midway point of the season.
 Franck Perera replaced Jonathan Kennard at A.S. Roma also at the midway point of the season. Julien Jousse replaced Perera to complete the final two rounds for A.S. Roma.
 Enrique Bernoldi was replaced by Jonathan Kennard at CR Flamengo at the Monza round while Bernoldi was on FIA GT Championship duty.
 Duncan Tappy was replaced by Scott Mansell at Galatasaray S.K. at the Donington round. Ho-Pin Tung replaced Mansell after Donington and completed the rest of the season for Galatasaray.
 Miguel Molina was replaced by Esteban Guerrieri at Al Ain at the Zolder round. Al Ain left the series after the Zolder round. Guerrieri represented Sevilla FC at the Donington round.
 Sébastien Bourdais replaced Esteben Guerrieri at Sevilla FC from the Estoril round onwards to complete the season for Sevilla.
 Esteban Guerrieri replaced Davide Rigon at Olympiacos CFP from the Estoril round onwards to complete the season for Olympiacos.
 Ho-Pin Tung was replaced by María de Villota at Atlético Madrid at the Estoril round. María de Villota completed the season for Atlético Madrid.
 Álvaro Parente replaced the injured Tristan Gommendy at F.C. Porto at the Estoril round.

2009 Schedule
 The calendar for the season was announced on January 29, 2009.
 Adding to last year's qualifying and race format, a third 'Super Final' race was added to 4 out of the 6 events for the top six points scorers from the weekend's first two races (although it was initially the top three finishers from the two races qualifying – it was changed prior to round 4 of the season). The six cars raced to decide a 'Weekend Winner' and to whom the top prize money would go but no points were awarded for this race.
 Official race commentary on the SF World Feed same from Ben Edwards and Bruce Jouanny for every round of the season. Jonathan Green and Martin Haven have also featured in the commentary box. Ben Constanduros and Warren Pole were the pitlane reporters and interviewers.

Race calendar and results

 Race 2 starts with reverse grid from finishing order of Race 1.

Test calendar and results
 There was an initial shakedown of the new car at Magny-Cours, France on April 28, 2009 by the Alan Docking Racing team. Australian John Martin completed laps of the circuit in the updated Rangers F.C. car, before signing up to drive for them. There were further tests at Zolder, Belgium from June 17–18 in which no real pacesetter was obvious, although Dominick Muermans and John Martin put in solid runs to go quickest. Prior to the opening round, most cars tested at Magny-Cours on June 26 in which Adrián Vallés for Liverpool F.C. and Hitech Junior Team was ultimately fastest.

Championship standings

References

External links
 Superleague Formula Official Website
 V12 Racing: Independent Superleague Formula Fansite Magazine

 
Superleague Formula
Superleague Formula season
Superleague Formula